Earl of Erroll (also spelled Errol) is a title in the Peerage of Scotland. It may refer to:

Earl of Erroll, 24 peers who have carried this title
See 24 individual articles
The Earl of Errol (ballad), a Child Ballad
Earl of Erroll (reel), Scottish dances